"Gee Whiz (Look at His Eyes)" is a song written and performed by Carla Thomas.  It reached #5 on the U.S. R&B chart and #10 on the U.S. pop chart in 1961.  It was featured on her 1961 album Gee Whiz.

The song was produced by Chips Moman.

The song ranked #62 on Billboard magazine's Top 100 singles of 1961.

Other versions
Bernadette Peters released a version of the song as a single in 1980 which reached #3 on the adult contemporary chart and #31 on the U.S. pop chart.
Kathy Young released a version of the song on her 1961 album The Sound of Kathy Young.
The Crystals released a version of the song on their 1962 album Twist Uptown.
The Orlons released a version of the song on their 1963 album Not Me.
Fontella Bass released a version of the song on her 1966 album The 'New' Look.
Nella Dodds released a version of the song as a single in 1966, but it did not chart.
The Casinos released a version of the song on their 1967 album Then You Can Tell Me Goodbye.
Richard "Dimples" Fields released a version of the song on his 1977 album Ready for Anything.
The Emotions released a version of the song on their 1977 album Sunshine.
Cherrelle released a version of the song on her 1991 album The Woman I Am.

References

1960 songs
1960 singles
1966 singles
1980 singles
Kathy Young songs
The Crystals songs
The Casinos songs
The Emotions songs
Cherrelle songs
Song recordings produced by Chips Moman
Song recordings produced by Phil Spector
Song recordings produced by Narada Michael Walden
Atlantic Records singles
MCA Records singles